Quchapampa may refer to:

 Quchapampa (Ayacucho), a lake in Peru
 Quchapampa (Lima), a lake in Peru

See also 
 Cochabamba